Krasnoyarovo can refer to:

Krasnoyarovo, Amur Oblast
Krasnoyarovo, Ilishevsky District, Republic of Bashkortostan
Krasnoyarovo, Karmaskalinsky District, Republic of Bashkortostan
Krasnoyarovo, Republic of Buryatia